Richard Radl (August 27, 1911 – February 24, 1977) was an American politician who served in the Iowa House of Representatives from 1965 to 1973.

References

1911 births
1977 deaths
Politicians from Chicago
Democratic Party members of the Iowa House of Representatives
20th-century American politicians